Rutgers Business School – Newark and New Brunswick (also known as the Rutgers Business School, or RBS) is the graduate and undergraduate business school located on the Newark and New Brunswick campuses of Rutgers University.  It was founded in 1929.  It operated under several different names (the undergraduate Rutgers School of Business in New Brunswick and the Rutgers Graduate School of Management in Newark) before consolidating into Rutgers Business School. (The Rutgers School of Business in Camden remained a separate business school under the Rutgers University umbrella but was not part of the Newark/New Brunswick consolidation.)

Rutgers Business School offers bachelor's, master's, and Ph.D. degrees.

Facilities

In 2009 RBS opened a new facility in the first 11 stories of downtown Newark's One Washington Park office building that is home to the full-time and Executive MBA programs, the MQF program, and the Newark undergraduate program. 1 Washington Park is centrally located near highways and public transportation, notably Newark Broad Street Station, where there is service on New Jersey Transit Morris and Essex and Montclair-Boonton Lines (including Midtown Direct service to New York Penn Station) and Newark Light Rail service to Newark Penn Station. The Washington Park light rail station is also adjacent to the school.

Rutgers facilities in One Washington Park include classrooms, lecture halls, conference rooms, student and faculty lounges, offices, and a University Police substation. The new 3 story RBS entrance atrium features lecture halls, a trading floor, student lounge and study spaces, a rooftop garden, and the Bove Auditorium. One Park Bistro in the lobby of the building is owned by the university and operated by the university's contracted Aramark food service but is open to all tenants with a building ID. In 2011, it was announced the Rutgers–Newark campus would further expand around Washington Park, converting the former American Insurance Company Building into graduate student housing.

In 2011 RBS broke ground on a new school building located on the New Brunswick/Livingston Campus. This new building, which opened in September, 2013, is the focal point for the New Brunswick undergraduate program. Previously, in New Brunswick, RBS shared the Janice H. Levin Building with the School of Labor and Management Relations and Beck Hall with the School of Arts and Sciences on the Livingston Campus.

RBS also has facilities in Morristown Plaza in Morristown, New Jersey, Basking Ridge Country Club in Basking Ridge, Washington Street in Jersey City, and Robinson Road in Singapore. MBA programs were also previously offered in Beijing and Shanghai.

Accreditation and rankings
RBS is accredited by the Association to Advance Collegiate Schools of Business (AACSB) as well as the Accreditation Council for Pharmacy Education  while Rutgers University as a whole is accredited by the Middle States Association of Colleges and Schools.

RBS is ranked by US News #44 in Best Business Schools and 28th in Part-time MBA nationwide.

In April 2022, RBS was accused of creating fake jobs for graduates to boost MBA program rankings. The  lawsuit was expanded into a class-action lawsuit.

Research centers
Blanche & Irwin Lerner Center for Pharmaceutical Management Studies
Mahmud Hassan, director
Center for Governmental Accounting Education & Research
Robert H. Werner, director
Yaw M. Mensah, research director
Institute for Ethical Leadership
James Abruzzo, co-director
Alex Plinio, co-director
Center for Research in Regulated Industries
Michael A. Crew, director
Center for Supply Chain Management
Lei Lei, director
East Asian Business Center
John Cantwell, director
Peter R. Gillett, academic director
Rutgers Accounting Research Center
Miklos Vasarhelyi, director
Technology Management Research Center
George F. Farris, director
 Whitcomb Center for Research in Financial Services
Ivan E. Brick and Michael S. Long, co-directors

In April 2017, Rutgers Business School accepted $1 million from IFlytek to create a big data research laboratory. The same company was later placed on a Bureau of Industry and Security blacklist for allegedly enabling human rights abuses in Xinjiang with its technology.

Notable alumni

Greg Brown, chairman and CEO of Motorola Solutions
Frank Cassidy, president of PSEG Power
Gary Cohen, president of BD Medical/Board Member, for Accordia Global Health Foundation
Mark Fields, CEO of Ford Motor Company
Stephanie Kusie, Canadian politician and member of Parliament for Calgary Midnapore 
Alvaro de Molina, CFO of Bank of America, CEO of GMAC
Alicia Nieves, reporter for Cheddar News
Bill Rasmussen, founder of ESPN
Bill Schultz, CEO of Fender
Gary Rodkin, president and CEO of ConAgra Foods
Rana Kapoor, founder of Yes Bank

See also
List of Rutgers University people
Post-secondary education in New Jersey
List of universities named after people
List of United States business school rankings
List of business schools in the United States
Lists of business schools

References

External links

Business schools in New Jersey
Rutgers University colleges and schools
Bus
Educational institutions established in 1929
1929 establishments in New Jersey